Twinkle Khanna (also known as Tina Jatin Khanna; born on 29 December 1974) is an Indian author, columnist, interior designer, film producer and a former film actress.

In 2015, she released her first non-fiction book, "Mrs Funnybones" which was declared a bestseller,  making Khanna India’s highest-selling woman writer that year.

Her second book “The Legend of Lakshmi Prasad” a collection of short stories, one of which was based on social entrepreneur Arunachalam Muruganantham was later made into National Award winning feature film, Pad Man with the focus on dispelling taboos around menstruation  It was produced under Khanna's production house Mrs. Funnybones Movies which was set up in 2016.

Her most recent book and first novel, Pyjamas Are Forgiving (Juggernaut Books, 2018) made her the highest-selling female author in India in the year 2018, according to Nielsen BookScan India.

In 2019, Twinkle Khanna also launched Tweak India, a bilingual digital media platform for women.

Early life and family 
Twinkle Khanna was born on 29 December in Mumbai, the first of two daughters of veteran Hindi film actors Dimple Kapadia and Rajesh Khanna, with whom she shared her birthday. Her maternal grandfather, Chunnibhai Kapadia was a Gujarati businessman and her father Rajesh Khanna, born in Punjabi Khatri in Amritsar, Punjab, was from a family of railway contractors. On her mother's side, she is the niece of Simple Kapadia, an actress and costume designer whom she "adored". Her sister Rinke Khanna and cousin Karan Kapadia have also acted in films.

Khanna attended the New Era High School, Panchgani and the Narsee Monjee College of Commerce and Economics. After finishing her Class 12th, she wanted to pursue a career as chartered accountant and gave the entrance examination but joined the film industry instead on the insistence of her parents. Before beginning her film career, Khanna went through an eye surgery.

She is currently pursuing Master of Arts from Goldsmiths at University of London.

Career

Acting career 

Khanna made her screen debut opposite Bobby Deol in Rajkumar Santoshi's romance Barsaat (1995). She was cast by Dharmendra and before the film's release Khanna signed for two more projects. It performed well at the box office and became the sixth-highest-grossing film of the year, and she received the Filmfare Award for Best Female Debut for her performance. The following year she played lead roles in Raj Kanwar's action film Jaan and Lawrence D'Souza's romance Dil Tera Diwana opposite Ajay Devgn and Saif Ali Khan respectively. Jaan was a box office hit and Dil Tera Deewana failed to do well. K.N. Vijiyan of the New Straits Times wrote that "Khanna does not look like a typical Hindi actress". While reviewing Dil Tera Diwana, Vijiyan wrote about Khanna: "Unlike her previous movies, she looks really good in all her scenes and she can act well." In 1997, two films featuring her; Uff! Yeh Mohabbat and Itihaas were released. Both of these films were poor box office performers. Her only release in 1998 was Jab Pyaar Kisise Hota Hai, which featured her as Salman Khan's love interest and was a box office success. Khanna acted opposite Akshay Kumar in two action films: International Khiladi and Zulmi (both 1999). In the former she played a news reporter who falls in love with a criminal whom she interviews. Both performed poorly at the box office. She was paired with Daggubati Venkatesh in the Telugu film Seenu (1999).

Khanna played the lead role in Baadshah (1999), featuring Shah Rukh Khan as a detective. In the same year, she acted opposite Saif Ali Khan in Yeh Hai Mumbai Meri Jaan, a romantic comedy directed by Mahesh Bhatt. She was paired opposite Aamir Khan in Dharmesh Darshan's Mela (2000). Similar to The Seven Samurai in story, it was an average grosser at the box office. Chal Mere Bhai (2000) featured Khanna in a special appearance beside a leading role in the comedy Joru Ka Ghulam, opposite Govinda. She also acted in the David Dhawan-directed comedy Jodi No.1 (2001). Her acting in the film met with poor reviews. Film director Karan Johar admitted in an interview that Khanna was in his mind for the role of Tina in Kuch Kuch Hota Hai, but she refused it, and thus Rani Mukerji was signed. She left the industry after her marriage to Akshay Kumar in 2001, citing that she did not enjoy the acting profession any more. Her last film was Love Ke Liye Kuch Bhi Karega (2001), a remake of the Telugu movie Money (1993). It featured her opposite Fardeen Khan and was an average grosser at the box office.

Off-screen work 
In August and October 1999, Khanna performed in the Awesome Foursome concert held at the Shah Alam Outdoor Stadium, Malaysia and the Magnificent Five concert at Birmingham, England. Juhi Chawla, Shah Rukh Khan and Salman Khan accompanied her in the former while in the latter she performed alongside Aamir Khan, Aishwarya Rai, Akshaye Khanna and Rani Mukherjee. The following year, she was part of the judges panel at Femina Miss India. She made her theatre debut as the female lead in Feroz Khan's All The Best in February 2001. In 2002, Khanna opened her own interior design store in Crawford Market, Mumbai, called The White Window, in partnership with her longtime friend Gurlein Manchanda. Since then, the store has received the Elle Decor International Design Award. She has opened up another branch of the store elsewhere in Mumbai. She does not hold a professional degree and worked with an architect for two years to learn the procedures. During her pregnancy, she practised maps and designs using CAD. Khanna did the interiors for Rani Mukerji's, Reemma Sen's and Tabu's houses, Kareena Kapoor's Bandra flat in 2008 and Poonam Bajaj's design studio. On the request of one of her clients, she ordered a company to make a golden toilet seat. Khanna is the Indian brand ambassador for L'Oréal.

Khanna has also endorsed for and designed Supertech's ORB project in Noida and another residential project in Pune. However, Khanna filed a case against Supertech for failing to pay  as endorsement fees. She also mentors International Institute of Fashion Designing's Academy of Interiors. Khanna is the co-founder of Grazing Goat Pictures and has co-produced the films Tees Maar Khan (2010) and Patiala House (2011). She also did a cameo appearance in the former film. Khanna has also co-produced Thank You (2011), Khiladi 786 (2012), 72 Miles (2013).She has also been the brand ambassador for the watch brand Movado and endorsed Coca-Cola and Micromax Mobile. In December 2016, Khanna launched her production house Mrs. Funnybones Movies which eventually co-produced Pad Man. The film went on to win the 2018 National Film Award for Best Film on Other Social Issues.

Khanna is a columnist at Daily News and Analysis after hours and The Times of India. Penguin Random House have announced that Khanna's book Mrs Funnybones hit the Nielsen bestseller list at number 2 in its first week of sales. Launched in Mumbai on 18 August 2015, the book reached number 1 on the bestseller chart of Crossword's Kemps Corner store and received praise from readers and press, eventually making Khanna the highest-selling female author in India for that year. Khanna's second book The Legend of Lakshmi Prasad, a collection of four short stories, launched in November 2016 sold more than  copies. Her latest book, Pyjamas Are Forgiving (Juggernaut Books, 2018) was released in September 2018 and has made her the highest-selling female author in India in the year 2018, according to Nielsen BookScan India. The publisher reported that the book debuted at number 1 on the Nielsen Bookscan All-India Bestseller List and sold over 100,000 copies.

Khanna has been actively advocating the cause of menstrual hygiene. She joined hands with Save the Children to promote the right to menstrual hygiene among children and slum communities. She was invited to speak at the University of Oxford in 2018. She was also invited to be a part of an eminent panel at the United Nations, New York and also appeared on BBC world Impact show to talk about menstrual hygiene and sanitation globally. In 2019, Khanna also launched Tweak, a bilingual digital media platform for women.

Personal life 

In 2001, Khanna camper for her father's election in New Delhi. She met Akshay Kumar, for the first time during a photo session for Filmfare magazine.

Together they worked on two movies. Twinkle Khanna and Akshay Kumar fell in love during the making of International Khiladi and Zulmi in 1998/1999.

They got married on 17 January 2001 and together have a son, Aarav and a daughter, Nitara. Kumar often credits Khanna for his success. In 2009, People magazine listed her as the fourth-best-dressed celebrity in India. In February 2014, she was operated on at the Breach Candy hospital for the removal of a kidney stone.

In 2009, during Lakme Fashion Week, she unbuttoned Akshay Kumar's jeans (only the first button). This incident created a controversy. A social worker wanted to file a complaint against the couple and the event organisers for obscenity. Khanna surrendered at the Vakola police station and was released on bail. In July 2013, the Bombay High Court ordered the police to prosecute Khanna and her husband. In 2014, Khanna and her sister sold their father's house for 85 crores. She has maintained a Twitter account since November 2014.

Filmography

As actress

As producer

Awards

Bibliography

References

Further reading

External links 

 
 
 Collected News and commentary at The Times of India
 The Legend of Laxmi Prasad by Twinkle Khanna

20th-century Indian actresses
21st-century Indian actresses
21st-century Indian businesspeople
21st-century Indian businesswomen
21st-century Indian designers
21st-century Indian journalists
21st-century Indian women writers
Actresses from Mumbai
Actresses from Pune
Actresses in Hindi cinema
Businesswomen from Maharashtra
Film producers from Mumbai
Gujarati people
Indian columnists
Indian interior designers
Indian women designers
Indian women film producers
Living people
Punjabi people
Indian women columnists
Women writers from Maharashtra
Writers from Mumbai
Writers from Pune
Filmfare Awards winners
Alumni of the University of London
Alumni of Goldsmiths, University of London
1974 births